The 1985–86 season was Paris Saint-Germain's 16th season in existence. PSG played their home league games at the Parc des Princes in Paris, registering an average attendance of 25,832 spectators per match. The club was presided by Francis Borelli and the team was coached by Gérard Houllier. Luis Fernandez was the team captain.

Summary

A little over a year after the cup loss to the principality side, Paris conquered France under Gérard Houllier's guidance, who had taken over from Christian Coste. PSG were crowned league champions for the first time in their history in 1985–86, much to the joy of their growing fanbase in the Kop of Boulogne stand. Boulogne Boys, the club's first ultra group and one of their most famous supporters' groups ever, were founded in 1985.

Paris Saint-Germain dominated the championship from start to finish thanks in big part to the likes of Joël Bats, Dominique Bathenay, Luis Fernandez, Dominique Rocheteau and Safet Sušić, all of whom made up the backbone of the team. The victory away to Toulouse on Matchday 3 meant PSG sat at the top of the table for the first time ever, a spot they never relinquished, going a memorable 26 matches without defeat towards the title. It had been 50 years since a Parisian club had won the league. The last to do so were Racing Paris in 1935–36. PSG were also close to claiming the league-cup double, only just crashing out of the French Cup semifinals to eventual champions Bordeaux.

Players 

As of the 1985–86 season.

Squad

Out on loan

Transfers 

As of the 1985–86 season.

Arrivals

Departures

Kits 

French radio RTL was the shirt sponsor. French sportswear brand Le Coq Sportif was the kit manufacturer.

Friendly tournaments

Tournoi de Mulhouse

Tournoi de Paris

Tournoi Indoor de Paris-Bercy

First group stage (Group B)

Second group stage (Ranking Group)

Coupe des Rois

Competitions

Overview

Division 1

League table

Results by round

Matches

Coupe de France

Round of 64

Round of 32

Round of 16

Quarter-finals

Semi-finals

Statistics 

As of the 1985–86 season.

Appearances and goals 

|-
!colspan="16" style="background:#dcdcdc; text-align:center"|Goalkeepers

|-
!colspan="16" style="background:#dcdcdc; text-align:center"|Defenders

|-
!colspan="16" style="background:#dcdcdc; text-align:center"|Midfielders

|-
!colspan="16" style="background:#dcdcdc; text-align:center"|Forwards

|-
!colspan="16" style="background:#dcdcdc; text-align:center"|Players transferred / loaned out during the season

|-

References

External links 

Official websites
 PSG.FR - Site officiel du Paris Saint-Germain
 Paris Saint-Germain - Ligue 1 
 Paris Saint-Germain - UEFA.com

Paris Saint-Germain F.C. seasons
French football clubs 1985–86 season
French football championship-winning seasons